Magteyeber (also Romanized as Magţʿeyeber; also known as Maktāyebūr, Makteyebūr, Maktībūr, and Makţī‘-e Jabar) is a village in Hoveyzeh Rural District, in the Central District of Hoveyzeh County, Khuzestan Province, Iran. At the 2006 census, its population was 78, in 18 families.

References 

Populated places in Hoveyzeh County